The POMD-1 is a cylindrical scatterable Bulgarian anti-personnel mine, used in the KNURS-DM 122 mm rocket fired from the BM-21 vehicle mounted rocket launcher.  In one 122 mm rocket, a single POMD-1 mine was carried along with 16 PMD-1 AP pressure mines, and four TMD-1 anti-tank mines. 

Once the mine is scattered, the top is ejected, allowing the spring-loaded legs to fold down. Also four tripwires are launched away from the mine. After a short period the mine is armed, from that point on, any disturbance of the trip wires will trigger the mine, scattering fragments to a lethal radius of approximately 15 meters.

The mine has been withdrawn from Bulgarian service and all stocks have been destroyed.

Specifications
 Diameter: 112 mm
 Height: 135 mm
 Weight: 2.7 kg
 Explosive content: 250 g of A-IX-1

References
 Jane's Mines and Mine Clearance 2005-2006
 

Anti-personnel mines
Land mines of Bulgaria
Submunitions